Heresie may refer to:

 Heresie (album), an album by Univers Zero
 Heresie (EP), an EP by Virgin Prunes